Oberea bimaculata is a species of flat-faced longhorn beetle in the tribe Saperdini in the genus Oberea, discovered by Olivier in 1795.

References

B
Beetles described in 1795